"Somebody to Shove" is a song by American alternative rock band Soul Asylum, released in 1992. The song was written by Soul Asylum's lead singer, Dave Pirner. It was the first single from their sixth studio album, Grave Dancers Union (1992). It reached number one on the US Billboard Modern Rock Tracks chart and number nine on the Billboard Album Rock Tracks chart. The music video for the song was directed by American filmmaker Zack Snyder, who also directed the "Black Gold" videoclip.

Style
Musically the song is an alternative rock, garage rock, hard rock, post-grunge, and power pop song.

Track listings
UK CD single
 "Somebody to Shove"
 "Somebody to Shove" (unplugged)
 "Stranger" (unplugged)
 "Without a Trace" (live)

UK 7-inch and cassette single
A. "Somebody to Shove" – 3:15
B. "By the Way" (demo) – 3:44

UK 12-inch single
 "Somebody to Shove" – 3:15
 "By the Way" (demo) – 3:45
 "Somebody to Shove" (live version) – 3:17
 "Runaway Train" (live version) – 4:11

Charts

Release history

Other versions
An acoustic version of the song was include as a track on The Unplugged Collection, Volume One.

See also
 List of Billboard Modern Rock Tracks number ones of the 1990s

References

1992 songs
1992 singles
Columbia Records singles
Song recordings produced by Michael Beinhorn
Songs written by Dave Pirner
Soul Asylum songs